Epicrocis is a genus of snout moths. It was described by Philipp Christoph Zeller in 1848.

Species
 Epicrocis abbreviata (Balinsky, 1994)
 Epicrocis africanella (Ragonot, 1888)
 Epicrocis albigeralis (Walker, 1865)
 Epicrocis ancylosiformis (Balinsky, 1994)
 Epicrocis anthracanthes Meyrick, 1934
 Epicrocis arcana (Balinsky, 1994)
 Epicrocis atrilinea Horak, 1997
 Epicrocis brevipalpata (Balinsky, 1994)
 Epicrocis complicata (Balinsky, 1994)
 Epicrocis coriacelloides (Balinsky, 1994)
 Epicrocis crassa (Balinsky, 1994)
 Epicrocis ferrealis (Hampson, 1898)
 Epicrocis festivella Zeller, 1848
 Epicrocis flavicosta (Balinsky, 1994)
 Epicrocis furcilinea (Balinsky, 1994)
 Epicrocis gracilis (Balinsky, 1994)
 Epicrocis gratella (Walker, 1863)
 Epicrocis hilarella Ragonot, 1888
 Epicrocis holophaea (Hampson, 1926)
 Epicrocis imitans (Balinsky, 1994)
 Epicrocis insolita (Balinsky, 1994)
 Epicrocis intermedia (Balinsky, 1994)
 Epicrocis laticostella (Ragonot, 1888)
 Epicrocis mesembrina Meyrick, 1887
 Epicrocis metallopa (Lower, 1898)
 Epicrocis nigricans (Ragonot, 1888)
 Epicrocis nigrilinea (de Joannis, 1927)
 Epicrocis nigrinella (Balinsky, 1994)
 Epicrocis noncapillata (Balinsky, 1994)
 Epicrocis oegnusalis (Walker, 1859)
 Epicrocis ornata (Balinsky, 1994)
 Epicrocis ornatella (Balinsky, 1994)
 Epicrocis picta (Balinsky, 1991)
 Epicrocis piliferella (Ragonot, 1888)
 Epicrocis plumbifasciata (Balinsky, 1994)
 Epicrocis poliochyta Turner, 1924
 Epicrocis pseudonatalensis (Balinsky, 1994)
 Epicrocis pulchra Horak, 1997
 Epicrocis punctata (Balinsky, 1994)
 Epicrocis sacculata (Balinsky, 1994)
 Epicrocis sahariensis (Rothschild, 1921)
 Epicrocis signatella Pagenstecher, 1907
 Epicrocis spiculata (Balinsky, 1994)
 Epicrocis stibiella (Snellen, 1872)
 Epicrocis striaticosta (de Joannis, 1927)
 Epicrocis umbratella Pagenstecher, 1907
 Epicrocis vansoni (Balinsky, 1994)
 Epicrocis vicinella (de Joannis, 1927)

References

Phycitini
Pyralidae genera